This list is of the Historic Sites of Japan located within the Prefecture of Yamagata.

National Historic Sites
As of 1 December 2022, thirty-one Sites have been designated as being of national significance, including the Dewa Sendai Kaidō Nakayamagoe Pass, which spans the prefectural borders with Miyagi, and Mount Chōkai, which spans the prefectural borders with Akita.

| align="center"|Former Higashitagawa District Office and Assembly Buildingkyū-Higashitagawa gunyakusho oyobi gunkaigi jidō || Tsuruoka || || ||  ||  || 
|-
|}

Prefectural Historic Sites
As of 1 May 2022, thirty-two Sites have been designated as being of prefectural importance.

Municipal Historic Sites
As of 1 May 2022 a further one hundred and seventy-one Sites have been designated as being of municipal importance, including:

See also

 Cultural Properties of Japan
 Dewa Province
 Yamagata Prefectural Museum
 List of Cultural Properties of Japan - paintings (Yamagata)
 List of Places of Scenic Beauty of Japan (Yamagata)
 Thirteen Buddhist Sites of Dewa
 Thirteen Buddhist Sites of Yamagata

References

External links
 Cultural Properties in Yamagata Prefecture

History of Yamagata Prefecture
 Yamagata
Tourist attractions in Yamagata Prefecture
Buildings and structures in Yamagata Prefecture
Yamagata